Mohur is a village in the Pattukkottai taluk of Thanjavur district, Tamil Nadu, India.

Demographics 

As per the 2001 census, Mohur had a total population of 881 with 452 males and 429 females. The sex ratio was 949. The literacy rate was 67.36.

References 

 

Villages in Thanjavur district